Riverside, New Jersey may refer to:

 Riverside Township, New Jersey, a township in Burlington County
 Riverside station (River Line), a light-rail station in Riverside Township
 Riverside, Hunterdon County, New Jersey, an unincorporated community in Readington Township
 Riverside, Paterson, New Jersey, a neighborhood in Passaic County

See also 
 Riverside (disambiguation)